Edward Lawton may refer to:

 Edward Lawton (Deadshot), a character in the Deadshot comic series
 Edward Thaddeus Lawton (1913–1996), bishop of the Catholic Church